Youth Law Australia, formerly The National Children's and Youth Law Centre (NCYLC) is a Community Legal Centre which supports children and young people in Australia. It is the first community legal centre of its kind in Australia. Youth Law Australia is located within and supported by the University of New South Wales. Youth Law Australia provides free legal advice to children and young people under 25 across Australia through its innovative online delivery model. It also advocates for the rights of young people in Australia and conducts research on law reform.

In 2020-21, Youth Law Australia worked on 2799 legal matters for 1655 clients.

See also
 War Widows' Guild of Australia NSW
 Vets Beyond Borders
 Our Big Kitchen
 Women In Prison Advocacy Network

References

External links
 Website of Youth Law Australia

Non-profit organisations based in New South Wales
Child-related organisations in Australia
Legal organisations based in Australia